is one of five maritime colleges in Japan. At this college students can acquire licenses as a mariner of deck or an engineer.

Educational institutions established in 1897
Maritime colleges in Japan
Universities and colleges in Yamaguchi Prefecture
1897 establishments in Japan